Global Partners LP is an American energy supply company ranked 361 in the 2018 Fortune 500.  The company is organized as a master limited partnership, and its operations focus on the importing of petroleum products and marketing them in North America.  It wholesales products like crude oil, diesel oil, gasoline, heating oil and kerosene.

Its CEO is Eric Slifka and it is based in Waltham, Massachusetts.  The company was founded in 1933.

In March 2012, Global Partners acquired Alliance Energy, another company owned by the Slifka family that operated gas stations in the Northeast. In October 2012, Global Partners announced that it was buying a majority stake in two trans-loading facilities in North Dakota for a fee of around $80 million, expanding its presence in the Bakken region. It expanded in 2014 by acquiring the parent of Xtra Mart convenience stores.

History
Global was founded in 1933 as a single truck heating oil distributor. Since then, it has grown through the acquisitions of gasoline stations, convenience stores, pipelines, and storage terminals.

References

Further reading

External links
Official website

Companies listed on the New York Stock Exchange
Energy companies established in 1933
Companies based in Waltham, Massachusetts
Oil companies of the United States
Natural gas companies of the United States
1933 establishments in Massachusetts